Erebus: The Aftermath was a 1987 New Zealand television miniseries about Air New Zealand Flight 901, which crashed in Antarctica in 1979. The miniseries, a docudrama, was produced by Television New Zealand, and was broadcast in New Zealand and Australia. It was also aired by BBC 2 television in the UK. It was recently repeated by TVNZ to coincide with the 30th anniversary of the crash.

The series starred Frank Finlay as Justice Peter Mahon QC, the head of the Royal Commission of Inquiry that investigated the disaster, and David Cole as the chief witness. It was directed by Peter Sharp and written by Greg McGee. It was produced by Caterina De Nave. The series was partially based on Mahon's book Verdict on Erebus.

Erebus: The Aftermath won several New Zealand Film and TV Awards, including Best Drama Programme, Best Drama Series, Best Writer (Drama), Best Television Director, and Best Performance – Male in a Dramatic Role (by Ian Mune).

Erebus: The Aftermath can be viewed, but not loaned or copied, at the Wellington office of the New Zealand Film Archive.

Cast
Air New Zealand

 Morris "Morrie" Davis – Ian Mune
 Brian Hewitt – Peter Cox
 John Wilson – Lewis Martin
 Ross Johnson – Stephen Tozer
 Peter Grundy – Bruce Allpress
 Anthony Lawson – James Wright

New Zealand Government

 Rt. Hon. Robert Muldoon – Brian McDermott
 Sir Owen Woodhouse – Patrick Smyth

Legal Teams

 Paul Davison – Peter Elliott
 Roger MacLaren – Bruce Phillips
 Alastair MacAlister – Jonathan Elsom
 Colin Nicholson – Ken Blackburn
 John Henry QC – Frank Whitten
 David Williams – Geoffrey Snell
 Richard McGrane – Simon Prast

Royal Commission

 Justice Peter Mahon QC – Frank Finlay
 David Baragwanath – Jeffrey Thomas

Privy Council (London)

 Lord Diplock QC – Eddie Hegan

Civil Aviation Division

 Edgar Kippenberger – Jim MacFarlane
 Jack Spence – Don Hope Evans
 Eric Omundsen – Alistair Douglas

With:

 Helen Moulder
 Roy Billing
 Paul Gittins
 David Cole
 Maggie Maxwell
 Kevin Wilson
 Bill Johnson
 Paula Jones
 John Watson
 Dinah Priestley
 Pam Merwood
 Johnny Bond
 David Cameron
 Michael Morrissey

Narrator:

 Dick Weir

Technical Advisor

 Captain G. White

See also

 Air New Zealand Flight 901
 Peter Mahon (judge)
 Ron Chippindale
 Gordon Vette

External links 

New Zealand television miniseries
1980s New Zealand television series
Aviation television series
TVNZ original programming
1988 New Zealand television series debuts
1980s television miniseries
Television series set in 1979